Romania competed at the 2014 Summer Youth Olympics, in Nanjing, China from 16 August to 28 August 2014.

Medalists

Athletics

Romania qualified ten athletes.

Qualification Legend: Q=Final A (medal); qB=Final B (non-medal); qC=Final C (non-medal); qD=Final D (non-medal); qE=Final E (non-medal)

Boys
Track & road events

Field Events

Girls
Track & road events

Field events

Mixed events

Basketball

Romania qualified a boys' and girls' team from their performance at the 2013 3x3 World Tour Final.

Skills Competition

Boys' Tournament

Roster
 Dragos Gheorghe
 Tudor Gheorghe
 Nandor Kuti
 Nicolae Nicolescu

Group Stage

Round of 16

Quarterfinals

Knockout Stage

Girls' Tournament
Roster
 Iringo Debreczi
 Ana Ferariu
 Kincso Kelemen
 Beatrice Peter

Group Stage

Round of 16

Knockout Stage

Boxing

Romania qualified one boxer based on its performance at the 2014 AIBA Youth World Championships

Boys

Canoeing

Romania qualified two boats based on its performance at the 2013 World Junior Canoe Sprint and Slalom Championships.

Boys

Girls

Fencing

Romania qualified one athlete based on its performance at the 2014 FIE Cadet World Championships.

Boys

Mixed Team

Gymnastics

Artistic Gymnastics

Romania qualified one athlete based on its performance at the 2014 European WAG Championships.

Girls

Rhythmic Gymnastics

Romania qualified one athlete based on its performance at the 2014 Rhythmic Gymnastics Grand Prix in Moscow.

Individual

Judo

Romania qualified one athlete based on its performance at the 2013 Cadet World Judo Championships.

Individual

Team

Rowing

Romania qualified two boats based on its performance at the 2013 World Rowing Junior Championships.

Qualification Legend: FA=Final A (medal); FB=Final B (non-medal); FC=Final C (non-medal); FD=Final D (non-medal); SA/B=Semifinals A/B; SC/D=Semifinals C/D; R=Repechage

Swimming

Romania qualified four swimmers.

Boys

Girls

Table Tennis

Romania qualified one athlete based on its performance at the 2014 World Qualification Event.

Singles

Team

Qualification Legend: Q=Main Bracket (medal); qB=Consolation Bracket (non-medal)

Taekwondo

Romania qualified one athlete based on its performance at the Taekwondo Qualification Tournament.

Boys

Tennis

Romania qualified two athletes based on the 9 June 2014 ITF World Junior Rankings.

Singles

Doubles

Weightlifting

Romania qualified 2 quotas in the boys' events and 2 quota in the girls' events based on the team ranking after the 2013 Weightlifting Youth World Championships.

Boys

Girls

References

2014 in Romanian sport
Nations at the 2014 Summer Youth Olympics
Romania at the Youth Olympics